Phrike (Ancient Greek: Φρίκη Phríkē) is the spirit of horror in Greek mythology. Her name literally means "tremor, shivering" (i. e. from fear, horror), and has the same stem as the verb φρίττω (phrittō) "to tremble". The term "Phrike" (personified or not) is widely used in tragedy.

Her Latin equivalent was Horror.

Notes

References

 Aeschylus, translated in two volumes. 1. Prometheus Bound by Herbert Weir Smyth, Ph. D. Cambridge, MA. Harvard University Press. 1926. Online version at the Perseus Digital Library. Greek text available from the same website.
 Euripides, The Plays of Euripides translated by E. P. Coleridge. Volume I. London. George Bell and Sons. 1891. Online version at the Perseus Digital Library.
 Euripides, Euripidis Fabulae. vol. 2. Gilbert Murray. Oxford. Clarendon Press, Oxford. 1913. Greek text available at the Perseus Digital Library.
 Lucius Annaeus Seneca, Tragedies. Translated by Miller, Frank Justus. Loeb Classical Library Volumes. Cambridge, MA, Harvard University Press; London, William Heinemann Ltd. 1917. Online version at theio.com.
 Lucius Annaeus Seneca, Tragoediae. Rudolf Peiper. Gustav Richter. Leipzig. Teubner. 1921. Latin text available at the Perseus Digital Library.
 Sophocles, The Oedipus Tyrannus of Sophocles edited with introduction and notes by Sir Richard Jebb. Cambridge. Cambridge University Press. 1893. Online version at the Perseus Digital Library.
 Sophocles, Sophocles. Vol 1: Oedipus the king. Oedipus at Colonus. Antigone. With an English translation by F. Storr. The Loeb classical library, 20. Francis Storr. London; New York. William Heinemann Ltd.; The Macmillan Company. 1912. Greek text available at the Perseus Digital Library.
 In the PlayStation 5 game Returnal, Phrike is the boss of the Overgrown Forest level and one of the challenges that players have to conquer to escape Atropos.

Greek goddesses
Personifications in Greek mythology